Qamaruddin Maziar Kouhyar (Dari: مازیار كوهيار; born 30 September 1997) is an Afghan professional footballer who plays as a midfielder for  club York City and the Afghanistan national team. He is the first Afghan to play professionally in Great Britain.

Club career
Born in Badakhshan Province in Afghanistan, Kouhyar moved to England as a two-year-old due to conflict in his home country. His parents settled in Handsworth suburb of Birmingham and his father worked as a pizza delivery driver, before returning to Afghanistan to work as an interpreter, leaving his mother to bring up the four children. At the age of eleven he was spotted by a Coventry City scout after attending a Saturday football session with his cousin, and joined the club's youth system.

Walsall
After being released from Coventry at the age of sixteen, he played in Sunday league football, before being spotted by a Walsall scout whilst playing in a local Powerleague. After a trial, he subsequently joined the club. He went on to sign a two-year scholarship with the club, progressing to sign his first professional deal in February 2016, on a one-year contract with the option of a further year. He made his professional debut in August 2016, in a 2–0 defeat to Chesterfield, replacing Kieron Morris as a substitute. He scored his first goal for Walsall in an EFL Trophy tie against Grimsby Town on 30 August 2016.
On 9 December 2016 he signed a new contract with Walsall until the summer of 2019.

He left Walsall due to a knee injury, and began working in a fried chicken shop.

In a November 2020 interview following his departure from the club, Kouhyar spoke out against abuse he had received during his time with the club in which he had been labelled a "terrorist" by a teammate.

Hereford
In March 2021, Kouhyar signed for National League North club Hereford having been away from football for eighteen months with an ACL injury. Despite the early cancellation of the season, Kouhyar was part of the Hereford team that made it to the 2021 FA Trophy Final, defeated 3–1 by league below Hornchurch.

After scoring three goals and registering an assist as his team pushed for the play-offs, Kouhyar was awarded the National League North Player of the Month award for February 2022. This award came after reported interest from Football League scouts.

York City

On 22 March 2022, Kouhyar signed for National League North club York City on a free transfer. On 15 April, Kouhyar scored his first goal for York in a 1-0 National League North victory over Spennymoor Town. The season ended in success for Kouhyar and York as they secured promotion to the National League through the play-offs, Kouhyar scoring the second goal in a 2–0 final victory over Boston United.

International career
In October 2016, he received his first call-up to the Afghanistan national team for the friendly against Malaysia. While he was on international duty with the national team, he picked up an injury which cost him a minimum of three months without playtime and required knee surgery. Kouhyar made his formal debut for Afghanistan in a friendly 2–0 loss to Oman on 30 August 2017. In 2018 he rejected a call-up for a home match against Palestine as his family did not want him to travel to Kabul.

Kouhyar scored a first international goal in March 2022, scoring the first in an eventual 3–0 victory over Kuwait Under-23.

Personal life
Outside of football, Kouhyar attends an accountancy evening course.

Career statistics

Club

International
Afghanistan score listed first, score column indicates score after each Kouhyar goal

Honours
Hereford
FA Trophy runner-up: 2020–21

York City
National League North play-off Winners: 2022

Individual
National League North Player of the Month: February 2022

References

External links

1997 births
Living people
People from Badakhshan Province
Afghan footballers
Association football midfielders
Walsall F.C. players
Hereford F.C. players
York City F.C. players
English Football League players
National League (English football) players
Afghanistan international footballers
Afghan emigrants to England
British Asian footballers